Tarong Branch Railway.  Plans for this thirty kilometre branch line in south-east Queensland, Australia were approved on 12 December 1911 together with an undertaking to extend it further south to Cooyar. Opened on 15 December 1915, the line passed through sidings at Taabinga Village, Boonenne, Goodger, Archookoora and Brooklands.

A mixed train ran thrice weekly but on 1 July 1961 the line closed. The promised link to Cooyar was never built.

References 

 "Triumph of Narrow Gauge: A History of Queensland Railways" by John Kerr 1990 Boolarong Press, Brisbane

External links
 1925 map of the Queensland railway system

Closed railway lines in Queensland
Railway lines opened in 1915
Railway lines closed in 1961
Wide Bay–Burnett
1915 establishments in Australia
1961 disestablishments in Australia